San Jacinto Tower may refer to:

 San Jacinto Monument, a monument in Harris County, Texas
 2100 Ross Avenue or San Jacinto Tower, a skyscraper in Dallas, Texas